

Background 
The Rabbinical courts are part of the Israeli legal system, which also includes the religious courts, which adjudicate Jewish law. In the laws of the State of Israel, the rabbinical courts are granted exclusive jurisdiction over the matters of marriage and divorce of those who are recognized as Jewish according to Halacha, the powers of personal law under certain conditions, including conversion. Courts have additional powers related to marriage and divorce, as well as religious matters. The body responsible for the rabbinical courts is the administration of the rabbinical courts. At the head of the rabbinical court system is the Great Rabbinical Court of Appeals in Jerusalem, headed by one of the two chief rabbis of Israel. The Great Rabbinical Court of Appeals currently headed by Rabbi David Lau, who also serves as President of the Great Rabbinical Court.

2023 Judicial Reforms 
Simultaneous to the proposed reforms to the civil judiciary and balance of powers in Israel, the current government of Israel, headed by Prime Minister Netanyahu, is progressing legislation to widen the authority of the Rabbinical courts through the Rabbinical Courts Jurisdiction (Adjudication) Bill 2023.

Summary of the Bill 
The Bill provides rabbinical courts with the same arbitration authority as civil arbitration, such that rabbinical courts could act as arbitrators in civil matters based on religious law if both parties so choose. According to the Bill, parties may elect to have their claims heard by the rabbinical courts instead of through the civil judiciary, including in instances where one of the parties is not of the Jewish religion.

Currently, rabbinic judges are limited to overseeing marriage and divorce proceedings for all Jewish Israelis, as well as certain issues dealing with conversions, and occasionally with wills and inheritances.

In introducing the Bill to the Knesset committee, Member of Knesset Yisrael Eichler said (translated from the Hebrew): "For all time the nation of Israel's courts were a foundation stone. The judge would approach the Torah's laws with respect, there was no bias for rich or poor, no bribery, no consideration of anything other than the law. We pray: return our judges as they once were. Especially today, when the judicial system is so blemished, steeped in politicization and imposing their political views on the public, now is the time to strengthen the Rabbinical courts, to give them the authority to adjudicate also on financial matters."

Reactions 
Critics point to evidence of bias against women and other institutional faults of the religious courts, documented inter alia by the state-run unit for overseeing these courts (which the current government has proposed shutting down).

Proponents have argued that the Bill provides for the voluntary election of rabbinical court jurisdiction, and does not force parties to utilize the religious courts. However, critics say that there are cases where such consent may be coerced, such as religious marriage contracts (where the husband may require the wife to consent in advance to using rabbinical courts in the event of a future divorce).

Chronology 
On 22 February 2023, the Knesset voted to advance the Bill through the legislative process.

See also
Beth din
2023 israeli judicial reforms

References

External links
Official website

Jewish courts and civil law
Orthodox Judaism in Israel